The 2013–14 season is Middlesbrough's fifth consecutive season in the Championship. They also competed in the League Cup which they were knocked out by Accrington Stanley in a 2–1 defeat and will also compete in the FA Cup. Following a poor run of form, the defeat to Barnsley saw Tony Mowbray's tenure at the club end on 21 October 2013. Following this announcement, his assistant manager Mark Venus took charge as caretaker manager. On 13 November, José Mourinho's former Real Madrid assistant Aitor Karanka signed a -year deal to become manager of Middlesbrough.

League table

Results and fixtures

Pre season

Championship

Results summary

Results by matchday

Matches

League Cup

FA Cup

Players

Appearances and Goals

|-
|colspan="14"|Players away from the club on loan:

|-
|colspan="14"|Players who appeared for Middlesbrough but left during the season:

First team coaches and staff

{| class="wikitable"
|-
!Position
!Staff
|-
|Manager||  Aitor Karanka
|-
|Assistant Manager||  Craig Hignett
|-
|Senior Professional Development Phase Coach||  Jamie Clapham
|-
|Goalkeeper Coach|| Leo Percovich
|-
|Fitness Coach|| Carlos Cachada
|-
|Fitness Coach|| Adam Kerr
|-
|Technical Analyst|| Javier Egido
|-
|Academy Manager|| Dave Parnaby
|-
|Europe Scout|| Gary Gill
|-

Transfers

In

Out

Loan In

Loan out

References

Middlesbrough F.C. seasons
Middlesbrough